The following is a list of African-American speakers of U.S. state legislatures.

Upper houses

Lower houses

References

African-American-related controversies
Speakers of U.S. state legislatures
African-American people